Pseudocharopa ledgbirdi, also known as the Mount Lidgbird pinwheel snail or the Mount Lidgbird charopid snail, is a species of pinwheel snail that is endemic to Australia's Lord Howe Island in the Tasman Sea.

Description
The ear-shaped shell of mature snails is 5.7–6.7 mm in height, with a diameter of 8.3–10.8 mm, with a moderately low spire, impressed sutures. It is dark brown with zigzag, cream-coloured flammulations (flame-like markings). The umbilicus is moderately wide. The ovate aperture is flattened on the upper edge.

Habitat
The snail is only known from Mount Lidgbird and Mount Gower, in rainforest on vertical rock faces. It is most easily found after rain, and probably shelters in small crevices during dry weather. It is considered to be Critically Endangered.

References

External links
 
 Brazier, J. (1889). Mollusca. In: Etheridge, R (ed.) The general zoology of Lord Howe Island; containing also an account of the collections made by the Australian Museum Collecting Party, Aug.–Sept., 1887, pp. 22-30. Memoirs of the Australian Museum. 2: 1-42
 Iredale, T. (1944). The land Mollusca of Lord Howe Island. The Australian Zoologist. 10(3): 299-334

 
ledgbirdi
Gastropods of Lord Howe Island
Taxa named by John Brazier
Gastropods described in 1889